Erica Willis (born 11 May 1934) is an Australian athlete. She competed in the women's long jump at the 1956 Summer Olympics.

References

1934 births
Living people
Athletes (track and field) at the 1956 Summer Olympics
Australian female long jumpers
Olympic athletes of Australia
Place of birth missing (living people)